Margaret G. Hermann (born 1938) is an American political psychologist.

Herman earned her undergraduate degree at DePauw University in 1960, and completed her master's degree and doctorate in psychology at Northwestern University in 1963 and 1965, respectively. Hermann was a postdoctoral fellow at the National Institute of Mental Health and served as visiting lecturer at Princeton University, before working at the Mershon Center for International Security Studies affiliated with Ohio State University. Hermann remained at Ohio State through 1998, when she took on the Gerald B. and Daphna Cramer Professorship of Global Affairs at the Maxwell School of Citizenship and Public Affairs within Syracuse University. Hermann was editor of the journal Political Psychology between 1980 and 1982, and the Mershon International Studies Review from 1993 to 1998. Hermann served as editor of the same journal between 2003 and 2007, by which time it was known by the name International Studies Review. Hermann was the president of the International Society of Political Psychology from 1987 to 1988, and served in the same role for the International Studies Association between 1998 and 1999. The Margaret Hermann Award given by the International Studies Association is named for her.

References

American women psychologists
American women political scientists
American political scientists
American political psychologists
Northwestern University alumni
DePauw University alumni
Ohio State University faculty
Syracuse University faculty
Academic journal editors
Living people
1938 births
American women academics
21st-century American women